Jaun Pass (German: Jaunpass, French: col de Bellegarde) is a high mountain pass (el. 1509 m.) in the Swiss Alps linking Charmey and Jaun in the canton of Fribourg with Reidenbach (part of the municipality of Boltigen) in the canton of Bern. The pass itself is located within the canton of Berne.

The pass road was completed in 1878.

See also
 List of highest paved roads in Europe
 List of mountain passes
List of the highest Swiss passes

References

External links 

Profile on climbbybike.com
Jaunpass.ch with tourist information, webcam 

Mountain passes of Switzerland
Mountain passes of the Alps
Bernese Oberland
Mountain passes of the canton of Bern